Nathaniel Lyon (July 14, 1818 – August 10, 1861) was the first Union general to be killed in the American Civil War. He is noted for his actions in Missouri in 1861, at the beginning of the conflict, to forestall secret secessionist plans of the governor Claiborne Jackson.

He had fought in the Second Seminole War in Florida and the Mexican–American War. After being assigned to Kansas, where many residents were divided about slavery and the Union, he developed strong pro-Union views. In February 1861, Lyon was made commander of the Union arsenal in St. Louis, Missouri (another divided state). Suspicious of governor Claiborne, who was working with Jefferson Davis on a secret plan for secession, Lyon forced the surrender of the pro-Confederate militia. 

Some civilians rioted and Lyon’s troops fired into the crowd, which came to be known as the Camp Jackson Affair. Lyon was promoted brigadier-general and given command of Union troops in Missouri. He was killed at the Battle of Wilson’s Creek, while trying to rally his outnumbered soldiers. Despite his passing during the first year of the war, Lyon’s efforts prevented the State of Missouri from joining the Confederacy.

Early life and education

Nathaniel Lyon was born on July 14, 1818, to Amasa and Kezia Lyon. His father was a sawmill operator who also dabbled in farming, and his mother was related to Revolutionary War hero Thomas Knowlton.  Raised on his father's farm, Nathaniel performed farm chores as a young child; at an early age he gained a reputation for seriousness and having a short temper.  Amasa was strict and not affectionate towards his children, and Nathaniel grew quite close to his mother.  Kezia was a devoted Christian, but Amasa tended towards rejecting organized Christianity, raising doubts about religion in Nathaniel's young mind.  He was educated in the local school system, and briefly attended an academy in Brooklyn, Connecticut.  After recommendations from family acquaintances, United States Representative Orrin Holt secured Lyon's appointment to the United States Military Academy (West Point) in early 1837.

Lyon officially entered West Point on July 1, 1837,  While there, he established a record of good discipline, receiving few demerits, although he received 12 for a single incident in February 1841 related to an incident of insubordination when he angrily refused to turn over his orders to an officer.  Academically, he struggled with calculus, drawing, and infantry tactics, but did well in natural philosophy, engineering, and artillery.  Lyon's cousin Miner Knowlton was an assistant professor at West Point and served as a mentor for him.  In 1841, he graduated from West Point ranked number 11th out of 52 cadets.  Around this time, Lyon also displayed a romantic affection for a woman known as "Miss Tot"; her identity and the details of the relationship are unknown, but biographer Christopher Phillips suggests that the failure of this relationship may have contributed to Lyon's later decision to never marry.  Traditionally, higher-ranked graduates of West Point were given the option to enter the United States Corps of Engineers, which was viewed as a desirable assignment, but Lyon instead chose to be assigned to the infantry, where he believed that promotion would come quicker.  Briefly returning to Ashford after his graduation, Lyon received a commission as a second lieutenant on July 1.

Military career
Upon graduating from West Point, Lyon was commissioned as a 2nd lieutenant and assigned to the 2nd U.S. Infantry Regiment after graduation and served with them in the Seminole Wars and the Mexican–American War. Despite denouncing American involvement in the Mexican War, he was promoted to first lieutenant for "conspicuous bravery in capturing enemy artillery" at the Battle for Mexico City and received a brevet promotion to captain for the battles of Contreras and Churubusco. Although he was eligible for membership, Lyon did not join the Aztec Club of 1847 when it was formed in Mexico City in 1847.

After the Mexican War, Lyon was then posted to the frontier, where forces under his command perpetrated the massacre of Pomo Native Americans at Clear Lake, California, the 1850 "Bloody Island Massacre"; in which as many as 100 old men, women and children were killed.

After being reassigned to Fort Riley, Kansas, Lyon became staunchly antislavery. He did not support the radicalism of the abolitionists, and came to support the Republican Party while serving in the border wars known as "Bleeding Kansas." In January 1861, he wrote about the secession crisis, "It is no longer useful to appeal to reason, but to the sword."

American Civil War

St. Louis Arsenal

In March 1861, shortly before the outbreak of the American Civil War, Lyon arrived in St. Louis in command of Company B of the 2nd U.S. Infantry. At the time the population and state of Missouri were relatively neutral in the dispute between North and South, but Governor Claiborne F. Jackson was a strong Southern sympathizer, as were many of the state legislators. Lyon guessed correctly that Jackson would seize the federal arsenal in St. Louis if the state seceded and that the Union had insufficient defensive forces to prevent the seizure.

He attempted to strengthen the defenses, but came into opposition from his superiors, including Brig. Gen. William S. Harney of the Department of the West. Lyon employed his friendship with Francis P. Blair, Jr., to have himself named commander of the arsenal. When the Civil War broke out and President Abraham Lincoln called for troops to put down the Confederacy, Missouri was asked to supply four regiments. Governor Jackson refused the request and ordered the Missouri State Guard to muster outside St. Louis under the stated purpose of training for home defense.

Wide Awakes

Lyon himself had been extensively involved in the St. Louis Wide Awakes, a pro-union paramilitary organization that he intended to arm from the arsenal and muster into the ranks of the federal army. Upon obtaining command of the arsenal, Lyon armed the Wide Awake units under guise of night. Lyon had most of the excess weapons in the arsenal secretly moved to Illinois. 

Lyon was aware of a clandestine operation whereby the Confederacy had shipped captured artillery from the U.S. arsenal in Baton Rouge to the Missouri State Militia camp in St. Louis. Lyon allegedly disguised himself as a farm woman to spy on the State Guard's camp and then claimed that he had uncovered a plan by Jackson to seize the arsenal for Missouri troops.

Camp Jackson affair
On May 10 Lyon directed the Missouri volunteer regiments and the 2nd U.S. Infantry to the camp, forcing its surrender. Riots broke out in St. Louis as Lyon marched his prisoners through the city to the St. Louis Arsenal. The event provoked the Camp Jackson Affair of May 10, 1861, in which Lyons' troops opened fire on a crowd of civilians injuring at least 75 and killing 28. 

Two federals and three militia were also killed and others were wounded. The source of the first shot is disputed, some witnesses claiming it was a drunken rioter, others claiming it was unprovoked. Lyon was nonetheless promoted to brigadier general May 17, and given command over the Union troops in Missouri May 31, 1861 as commander of the Department of the West.

Planters House Conference
On June 12, 1861 Lyon (accompanied by Congressman Colonel Francis P. Blair, Jr.) met with Governor Jackson and Major General Sterling Price of the Missouri State Guard (who both traveled under a safe conduct from Lyon) at St. Louis' Planter's House hotel to discuss the implementation and potential continuation of the  Price–Harney Truce between Federal forces and the State Guard. The discussions were conducted largely between Lyon and Jackson, who were generally intransigent in their respective positions: that U.S. forces had the right to move anywhere in the state, and that Federal forces should be restricted to the St. Louis-area, respectively.

After four unproductive hours Lyon eventually halted the meeting, informing Governor Jackson and MG Price that Jackson's demanded limitations on federal authority "means war". Lyon then allowed the two to leave St. Louis for Jefferson City by train, in accordance with the safe conduct.

Pursuit of Jackson
The governor fled first to the capitol at Jefferson City (ordering the tracks destroyed behind him), and then retreated with the State Guard to Boonville.  Lyon moved up the Missouri River by steamer and occupied Jefferson City without a fight on June 13.  Lyon continued the pursuit and on June 17 he defeated a portion of the State Guard at the Battle of Boonville.  The governor, his administration, and the Guard retreated to the southwest.

Lyon was subsequently supported by the reconvened Missouri State Convention which reconvened on July 22, 1861, declared the office of Governor and other state officials "vacant", and appointed a Unionist provisional state government under former Missouri Chief Justice Hamilton Gamble. Lyon assumed command of the Army of the West on July 2.  Lyon reinforced his army before moving southwest in pursuit of Jackson, Price and the State Guard.

Battle of Wilson's Creek and death

By July 13, Lyon was encamped at Springfield, Missouri, with about 6,000 Union soldiers. The Missouri State Guard, about 75 miles southwest of Lyon and under the command of Price, met with troops under Brig. Gen. Benjamin McCulloch near the end of July. The combined Confederate forces numbered about 12,000, formed plans to attack Springfield, and marched northeast on July 31.

The armies met at dawn a few miles southwest of Springfield on the morning of August 10 in the Battle of Wilson's Creek. Lyon was wounded twice in the fighting; shot in the head and leg and his horse shot from under him. He returned to Union lines and commandeered a bay horse ridden by Maj. E.L. McElhaney of the Missouri Infantry. Lyon, badly outnumbered by Confederate forces, then dramatically led a countercharge of the 2nd Kansas Infantry on Bloody Hill, where he was shot in the heart at about 9:30 am. Although the Union Army was defeated at Wilson's Creek, Lyon's quick action neutralized the effectiveness of pro-Southern forces in Missouri, allowing Union forces to secure the state.

Fate of Lyon's remains

In the confused aftermath of the Union retreat from Wilson's Creek, Lyon's body was mistakenly left behind on the battlefield and discovered by Confederate forces. It was briefly buried on a Union soldier's farm outside Springfield until it could be returned to Lyon's relatives. Eventually the remains were interred at the family plot in Eastford, Connecticut, where an estimated crowd of 15,000 attended the funeral. A cenotaph stands in memory of Lyon in the Springfield National Cemetery, Missouri.

Legacy
On December 24, 1861, the United States Congress passed a resolution of thanks for the "eminent and patriotic services of the late Brigadier General Nathaniel Lyon. The country to whose service he devoted his life will guard and preserve his fame as a part of its own glory. That the Thanks of Congress are hereby given to the brave officers who, under the command of the late general Lyon sustained the honor of the flag and achieved victory against overwhelming numbers at the battle of Springfield, Missouri."

Namesakes and honors
The 24th Missouri Volunteer Infantry was recruited as "The Lyon Legion" in honor of the General, and carried a unique regimental color, depicting a Lion beneath a constellation of six stars. Counties in Iowa, Kansas, Minnesota, and Nevada, are named in Nathaniel Lyon's honor. Two forts were also named in his honor: Fort Lyon in Colorado and Fort Lyon (Virginia), which defended Washington, D.C., during the American Civil War. Lyon Park in St. Louis, Lyon Street in San Francisco and Lyon Lane in Carson City, Nevada are also named for him.

A monument honoring Nathaniel Lyon was erected on Grand Boulevard in St. Louis in 1927. However, the monument was removed in 1960 when Harriet Frost Fordyce, a St. Louis philanthropist and youngest child of Confederate General Daniel Frost, agreed to donate one million dollars to help expand St. Louis University's campus on the condition that Lyon’s statue be removed. The city quickly removed the monument in Lyon Park, a small park near Anheuser-Busch Brewery. SLU later renamed its main campus the “Frost Campus” in honor of the Confederate General Frost.

Dates of rank
 Cadet, United States Military Academy - 1 July 1837
 2nd Lieutenant, 2nd Infantry - 1 July 1841
 1st Lieutenant, 2nd Infantry - 16 February 1847
 Brevet Captain - 20 August 1847
 Captain, 2nd Infantry - 11 June 1851
 Brigadier General, Missouri Volunteers - 12 May 1861
 Brigadier General, US Volunteers - 17 May 1861

See also
 Lyons family

 List of American Civil War generals (Union)

Notes

References
 Downhour, James G. "Nathaniel Lyon." In Encyclopedia of the American Civil War: A Political, Social, and Military History, edited by David S. Heidler and Jeanne T. Heidler. New York: W. W. Norton & Company, 2000. .
 Eicher, John H., and David J. Eicher. Civil War High Commands. Stanford, CA: Stanford University Press, 2001. .
 Garrison-Finderup, Ivadelle Dalton. Roots & Branches of Our Garrison Family Tree. Fresno, CA: Garrison Library, 1997. Library of Congress number 88-101324.
 Jackson, Paul E., Sr. The Family of William Andrew & Catherine Boyd Jackson – Focusing on the Descendants of Hugh T. & Mary A. Gold Jackson: A History of Southwest Missouri  St. Louis, MO: 1999-2011. ISBN B0006FDEFM
 Peckham, James, General Nathaniel Lyon, and Missouri in 1861: A Monograph of the Great Rebellion, New York, America News Company Publishers, 1866.
 
 Piston, William Garrett, and Richard W. Hatcher III. Wilson's Creek: The Second Battle of the Civil War and the Men Who Fought It. Chapel Hill: University of North Carolina Press, 2000. .
 
 Bloody Island Massacre website

Further reading

External links
 
 Wilson's Creek National Battlefield, National Park Service
 Lyon, Nathaniel, Springfield-Greene County Library System

1818 births
1861 deaths
People from Ashford, Connecticut
Union Army generals
United States Military Academy alumni
Bleeding Kansas
People of Missouri in the American Civil War
People of Connecticut in the American Civil War
Union military personnel killed in the American Civil War
Military personnel from Connecticut
Kansas Republicans
Missouri Republicans
Wartime cross-dressers